The white-browed conebill (Conirostrum ferrugineiventre) is a species of bird in the family Thraupidae.
It is found in Bolivia and Peru.
Its natural habitat is subtropical or tropical moist montane forests.

References

white-browed conebill
Birds of the Peruvian Andes
Birds of the Bolivian Andes
white-browed conebill
white-browed conebill
Taxonomy articles created by Polbot